The Wimborne Road Cemetery is located at Wimborne Road, Bournemouth. It is grade II listed with Historic England. The cemetery was opened in 1878 and laid out by the architect Christopher Crabb Creeke. St Augustin's Church stands across the road from the cemetery.

Cemetery Junction is a major intersection of the A347 road.

The cemetery contains the war graves of 48 Commonwealth service personnel of World War I and 38 of World War II.

Notable interments
 Frederick Abberline (1843–1929), British police Chief Inspector and detective
 Sir Evelyn Baring, 1st Earl of Cromer (1841–1917), statesman
 Guy Boothby (1867–1905), author
 Christopher Crabb Creeke (1820–1886), architect
 John Nelson Darby (1915–2003), founder of the Darbyites
 Antonia Forest (1915–2003), author
 Staff Surgeon RN William Job Maillard (1863–1903), Victoria Cross recipient in 1898 Occupation of Crete
 Francis Mawson Rattenbury (1867–1935), architect

References

External links
 

Grade II listed buildings in Dorset
Cemeteries in Dorset
Bournemouth
1878 establishments in England